The Oklahoma Publishing Company Building, also referred to as the Daily Oklahoman Building, is an historic structure on 4th and Broadway in Oklahoma City. It was built for the publishing company behind The Oklahoman. It was designed by Solomon Layton and built in 1909 after the paper's previous building was destroyed by fire. It is listed on the National Register for Historic Places. Layton also designed the Oklahoma State Capitol, governor's mansion, numerous county courthouses, public schools, and other significant structures.

It is a five-story building. The Oklahoma Publishing Company has a history in offering financial support in Oklahoma's educational, civic and social infrastructure.

References

Office buildings in Oklahoma City
Office buildings completed in 1909
Commercial buildings on the National Register of Historic Places in Oklahoma